Margaret de Badlesmere, Baroness Badlesmere ( de Clare; c. 1 April 1287 – 22 October 1333/January 1334, disputed) was a Anglo-Norman noblewoman, suo jure heiress, and the wife of Bartholomew de Badlesmere, 1st Baron Badlesmere.

She was arrested and subsequently imprisoned in the Tower of London for the duration of a year from November 1321 to November 1322, making her the first recorded female prisoner in the Tower's history. She was jailed on account of having ordered an armed assault on Isabella of France, Queen consort of King Edward II of England. Before Margaret had instructed her archers to fire upon Isabella and her escort, she had refused the Queen admittance to Leeds Castle where her husband, Baron Badlesmere held the post of governor, but which was legally the property of Queen Isabella as part of the latter's dower. Margaret surrendered the castle on 31 October 1321 after it was besieged by the King's forces using ballistas. Edward's capture of Leeds Castle was the catalyst which led to the Despenser War in the Welsh Marches and the north of England.

Upon her release from the Tower, Margaret entered a religious life at the convent house of the Minorite Sisters outside Aldgate. King Edward granted her a stipend to pay for her maintenance.

Background

Margaret was born at an unrecorded place in either Ireland or England on or about 1 April 1287, the youngest child of Thomas de Clare, Lord of Thomond and Juliana FitzGerald of Offaly, and was a granddaughter of Richard de Clare, Earl of Hertford and Gloucester. She had two brothers, Gilbert de Clare, Lord of Thomond, and Richard de Clare, 1st Lord Clare, Lord of Thomond, who was killed at the Battle of Dysert O'Dea in 1318; and an elder sister, Maud, whose first husband was Robert de Clifford, 1st Baron de Clifford. Margaret had an illegitimate half-brother, Richard. 

Her parents resided in both Ireland and England throughout their marriage; it has never been established where Juliana was residing at the time of Margaret's birth although the date is known.

Her father died on 29 August 1287, when she was almost five months of age. His cause of death has never been ascertained by historians. Her mother married her second husband, Nicholas Avenel, sometime afterwards, but the exact date of this marriage is not known. Between 11 December 1291 and 16 February 1292, Margaret acquired another stepfather when her mother married her third husband, Adam de Cretynges.

Inheritance
A series of inquisitions post mortem held in response to writs issued on 10 April 1321 established that Margaret, the wife of Bartholomew de Badlesmere and Maud, wife of Sir Robert de Welle (sisters of Richard de Clare and both aged 30 years and above) were the next heirs of Richard's son Thomas. Thomas' estate included the stewardship of the Forest of Essex, the town and castle at Thomond and numerous other properties in Ireland.

First Marriage
She married firstly before the year 1303, Gilbert de Umfraville, son of Gilbert de Umfraville, Earl of Angus, and Elizabeth Comyn. Upon their marriage, the Earl of Angus granted Gilbert and Margaret the manors of Hambleton and Market Overton; however, when Gilbert died childless prior to 1307, the manors passed to Margaret.

Second Marriage
On an unrecorded date earlier than 30 June 1308, when the couple were jointly granted the manor of Bourne, Sussex, Margaret married Bartholomew de Badlesmere, an English soldier and court official who was afterwards created 1st Baron Badlesmere by writ of summons. He had held the post of Governor of Bristol Castle since 1307, and during his life accumulated many remunerative grants and offices. It is feasible that Margaret's marriage to Badlesmere had been arranged by her brother-in-law, Baron Clifford; Badlesmere having been one of Clifford's retainers during the Scottish Wars. Clifford was later killed at the Battle of Bannockburn, where Badlesmere also fought.

Margaret was styled as Baroness Badlesmere on 26 October 1309 (the date her husband was by writ summoned to Parliament by the title of Baron Badlesmere) and henceforth known by that title.

When Margaret was visiting Cheshunt Manor in Hertfordshire in 1319, she was taken hostage by a group of sixty people, both men and women. Her captors demanded a ransom of £100 for her release. She was held prisoner for one night before being rescued on the following day by the King's favourite, Hugh Despenser the Younger. Hugh was married to Margaret's first cousin, Eleanor de Clare, eldest daughter of Gilbert de Clare, 7th Earl of Gloucester and Joan of Acre and also Eleanor was Edward II's niece. The King ordered the arrest and imprisonment of twenty of Margaret's kidnappers; they all, however, were eventually pardoned.

Issue
The five children of Margaret and Baron Badlesmere were:
 Margery de Badlesmere (1308/1309- 18 October 1363), married before 25 November 1316 William de Ros, 2nd Baron de Ros of Helmsley, by whom she had six children.
 Maud de Badlesmere (1310- 24 May 1366), married firstly, Robert FitzPayn; secondly, John de Vere, 7th Earl of Oxford, by whom she had seven children.
 Elizabeth de Badlesmere (1313- 8 June 1356), married firstly in 1316 Sir Edmund Mortimer, eldest son of Roger Mortimer, 1st Earl of March and Joan de Geneville, 2nd Baroness Geneville; she married secondly in 1335, William de Bohun, 1st Earl of Northampton and had children by both marriages.
 Giles de Badlesmere, 2nd Baron Badlesmere (18 October 1314 – 7 June 1338), married Elizabeth Montagu, but did not have any children by her.
 Margaret de Badlesmere (born 1315), married Sir John Tiptoft, 2nd Lord Tiptoft, by whom she had one son, Robert Tiptoft.

The siege of Leeds Castle

Margaret's husband, Baron Badlesmere was appointed Governor of the Royal Castle of Leeds in Kent in the fifth year of Edward II's reign (1312).
In October 1321, nine years after his assumption of the office, the queen consort Isabella went on a pilgrimage to the shrine of St. Thomas at Canterbury. She decided to interrupt her journey by stopping at Leeds Castle which legally belonged to her as the fortress and its demesne were part of her dower to be retained in widowhood. Badlesmere, who by then had become disaffected with King Edward and had joined the swelling ranks of his opponents, was away at a meeting of the Contrariants in Oxford at the time and had left Margaret in charge of the castle.

Shortly before, Baron Badlesmere had deposited all of his treasure and goods inside Leeds Castle for safe-keeping.

Due to her strong dislike of Isabella as well as her own belligerent and quarrelsome character,<ref group="n">Margaret's paternal grandmother, Maud de Lacy, was known as the most litigious woman in the 13th century. [Reference: Linda Elizabeth Mitchell. Portraits of Medieval Women: Family, Marriage and Politics in England 1225–1350]</ref> Margaret refused the Queen admittance. It was suggested by Francis Lancellott that Margaret's antipathy towards Queen Isabella had its origins in about 1317 when she had asked Isabella to use her influence on behalf of a friend who was seeking an appointment in the Exchequer Office. When Isabella refused her request, for reasons unknown, a quarrel ensued and henceforth Margaret became the Queen's enemy. 
Margaret allegedly told Isabella's marshal, whom she met on the lowered drawbridge, that "the Queen must seek some other lodging, for I would not admit anyone within the castle without an order from my lord [Baron Badlesmere]". After issuing her message, she subsequently ordered her archers to loose their arrows upon Isabella from the battlements when the Queen (having apparently ignored Margaret's communication) approached the outer barbican,Poyser, Arthur T. (2009). The Tower of London. BiblioLife. pp.27–28 in an attempt to enter the castle by force. The unexpected, lethal volley of arrows, which killed six of the royal escort, compelled Isabella to make a hasty retreat from the castle and to seek alternative accommodation for the night. Historian Paul C. Doherty suggests that the pilgrimage was a ruse on the part of the King and Queen to create a casus belli.  Edward would have known beforehand that Baron Badlesmere was with the Contrariants in Oxford and had left Leeds Castle in the hands of the belligerently hostile Baroness Badlesmere; therefore he had given instructions for Isabella to deliberately stop at Leeds aware she would likely be refused admittance. Using the insult against the Queen as a banner, he would then be able to gather the moderate nobles and outraged populace to his side as a means of crushing the Contrariants.

When King Edward heard of the violent reception his consort was given by Margaret, he was predictably outraged and personally mustered a sizeable force of men "aged between sixteen and sixty", including at least six earls, to join him in a military expedition which he promptly led against Margaret and her garrison at Leeds Castle to avenge the grievous insult delivered to the Queen by one of his subjects. Following a relentless assault of the fortress, which persisted for more than five days and with the King's troops using ballistas, Margaret surrendered at curfew on 31 October having received a "promise of mercy" from Edward. Throughout the siege, she had expected the Earl of Lancaster to arrive with his soldiery to relieve her, but this he had refused to do;Thomas, 2nd Earl of Lancaster was the uterine half-uncle of Queen Isabella, being the son of her maternal grandmother Blanche of Artois by the latter's second marriage to Edmund Crouchback, 1st Earl of Lancaster. nor had any of the other Contrariants or the Marcher Lords come to her assistance, which left her to defend the castle with merely her husband's nephew, Bartholomew de Burghersh, and the garrison troops. Baron Badlesmere, although supportive of Margaret's conduct, had only managed to despatch some knights from Witney to augment the garrison troops in the defence of Leeds. Once King Edward had gained possession of the castle and the Badlesmere treasure within, the seneschal, Walter Colepepper and 12 of the garrison were hanged from the battlements.Haines, p.133 Margaret was arrested and sent as a prisoner, along with her five children and Bartholomew de Burghersh, to the Tower of London;Ireland, William Henry (1829). England's Topographer: or A New and Complete History of the County of Kent. London: G. Virtue, Ivy Lane, Paternoster Row. p.647 she therefore became the first recorded woman imprisoned in the Tower.Poyser, pp.27–28 On her journey to the fortress, she was insulted and jeered at by the citizens of London who, out of loyalty to Isabella, had followed her progression through the streets to vent their fury against the person who had dared maltreat their queen.

Aftermath

The King's military victory at Leeds, accomplished with the help of six influential earls including the Earls of Pembroke and Richmond, encouraged him to reclaim and assert the prerogative powers that Lancaster and the Lords Ordainers had so long denied him.The Ordinances were repealed at the parliament held in York in May 1322. The dominant baronial oligarchy broke up into factions. Many of the nobles who had previously been hostile to Edward rushed to his side to quell the insurrection of the Marcher Lords, known as the Despenser War, which had erupted in full force after the King defiantly recalled to England the two Despensers (father and son,) whom the Ordainers had compelled him to banish in August 1321. The first sparks to the uprising had been ignited when, prior to his expulsion, the rapacious Hugh le Despenser the Younger had persuaded the infatuated King to grant him lands in the Welsh Marches which rightfully belonged to entrenched Marcher barons such as Roger Mortimer, his uncle Roger Mortimer de Chirk, and Humphrey de Bohun, 4th Earl of Hereford, a staunch Ordainer albeit the King's brother-in-law. They had formed a confederation and made devastating raids against Despenser holdings in Wales; and Mortimer led his men in an unsuccessful march on London. These mutinous events, in addition to other incidents which created a tense situation and called for a mobilisation of forces throughout the realm, eventually led to the Ordainers constraining the King to exile the favourites. However, subsequent to his capture of Leeds Castle and the harsh sentences he had meted out to the insubordinate Margaret de Clare and her garrison, King Edward defied the Contrariants by persuading the bishops to declare the Despensers' banishment illegal at a convocation of the clergy, and he summoned them home. This act had dire consequences in addition to the Despenser War: it paved the way for the complete domination of the grasping Despensers over Edward and his kingdom, leading to Roger Mortimer and Queen Isabella's 1326 Invasion of England, their assumption of power, the execution of the two Despensers, and finally, Edward's deposition.

Imprisonment

Baron Badlesmere excused his wife's bellicose actions at Leeds with his declaration that when he had left Margaret in charge of Leeds, he had given her strict instructions not to admit anyone inside the castle without his specific orders. This, he had insisted, included the Queen, with the words that "the royal prerogative of the King in the case of refusal of entry should not be assumed to provide a legal right for the Queen, who was merely his wife". As a result of Margaret's imprisonment, Badlesmere remained firmly aligned with the King's opponents; shortly afterwards he participated in the Earl of Lancaster's rebellion. Badlesmere was captured after taking part in the Battle of Boroughbridge on 16 March 1322 which had ended with a royalist victory. Following trial at Canterbury, he was executed at Blean on 14 April 1322.

Margaret remained imprisoned in the Tower until 3 November 1322, when she was released on the strength of a bond from her son-in-law William de Ros and five others. Presumably her children were released with her, but a record of the exact dates of their liberation has not been found.

Later life

Margaret retired to the convent house of the Minorite Sisters, outside Aldgate, where the abbess Alice de Sherstede was personally acquainted with Queen Isabella, who took an interest in the convent's business affairs. On 13 February 1322/3, the King granted Margaret a stipend of two shillings a day for her maintenance, which was paid to her by the Sheriff of Essex. She also received a considerable proportion of her late husband's manors for her dower.

Edward demonstrated his good will toward Margaret again on 1 July 1324, by giving her "permission to go to her friends within the realm whither she will, provided that she be always ready to come to the king when summoned". It appears that after then she lived at Hambleton, Rutland as it was from there that on 27 May 1325 she submitted a petition in connection with property at Chilham.

Her son Giles obtained a reversal of his father's attainder in 1328, and succeeded by writ to the barony as the 2nd Baron Badlesmere. By this time Edward III had ascended the throne; however, the de facto rulers of England were Queen Isabella and her lover, Marcher Lord Roger Mortimer, 1st Earl of March (father-in-law of Margaret's daughter Elizabeth), who jointly held the Office of Regent for the new king. Edward II had been deposed in January 1327 and allegedly murdered in September by Mortimer's hired assassins. The regency of Queen Isabella and Lord Mortimer ended in October 1330 when Edward III, now nearly 18, had Mortimer hanged as a traitor and Queen Isabella exiled for the remaining 28 years of her life at Castle Rising in Norfolk.

Margaret died between 22 October 1333 and 3 January 1333/4.

 Seal 

In 1328, Margaret's seal displayed three shields, consisting of those of each of her parents and a shield impaling the arms of her two dead husbands.

 Ancestry 

Notes

References

Bibliography
 Cokayne, G. E. The Complete Peerage of England, Scotland, Ireland, Great Britain and the United Kingdom, Extant, Extinct, or Dormant. 
 Costain, Thomas B. (1958).  The Three Edwards. Garden City, New York: Doubleday and Company, Inc. 
 Haines, Roy Martin (2003). King Edward II: Edward of Caernarfon, his life, his reign and its aftermath, 1284–1330. Montreal: McGill-Queens University Press. 
 Richardson, Douglas, Everingham, Kimball G. (2004). Magna Carta Ancestry: A Study in Colonial and Medieval Families''. Baltimore: Genealogical Publishing Company, Inc. 

1287 births
1330s deaths
Normans in Ireland
Prisoners in the Tower of London
Anglo-Norman women
English baronesses
14th-century English people
13th-century Irish people
13th-century Irish women
14th-century Irish people
14th-century Irish women
14th-century English women
13th-century English women
13th-century English people